Dimensions is a French project that makes educational movies about mathematics, focusing on spatial geometry. It uses POV-Ray to render some of the animations, and the films are released under a Creative Commons licence.

The film is separated in nine chapters, which follow this plot:

 Chapter 1: Dimension two explains Earth's coordinate system, and introduces the stereographic projection.
 Chapter 2: Dimension three discusses how two-dimensional beings would imagine three-dimensional objects.
 Chapters 3 and 4: The fourth dimension talks about four-dimensional polytopes (polychora), projecting the regular ones stereographically on the three-dimensional space.
 Chapters 5 and 6: Complex numbers are about the square root of negative numbers, transformations, and fractals.
 Chapters 7 and 8: Fibration show what a fibration is. Complex numbers are used again, and there are circles and tori rotating and being transformed.
 Chapter 9: Proof emphasizes the importance of proofs in mathematics, and proves the circle-conservationess of the stereographic projection as an example.

They are available for download in several languages.

References

External links
The project's website is http://www.dimensions-math.org/.

Animated series